Alexis Matthew Podchernikoff (March 17, 1886 - October 31, 1933) was an American painter. His work is at the Oakland Museum of California.

References

1886 births
1933 deaths
19th-century American painters
20th-century American painters